Berwick Township is an inactive township in Newton County, in the U.S. state of Missouri.

It has a population of 334, and is home to Berwick Church, Wright cemetery, as well as Clear Creek and Capps Creek.

Berwick Township took its name from the community of Berwick, Missouri.

References

External links
 Berwick Newton, Missouri on www.city-data.com

Townships in Newton County, Missouri
Townships in Missouri